Klake may refer to:

 Klake, Kozje, a village in Slovenia
 Klake, Croatia, a village near Samobor